Jessica Day may refer to:

 Jessica Day (New Girl), the title character in the television sitcom New Girl
 Jessica Day (Midnighters trilogy), a character in the science-fiction fantasy series written by Scott Westerfeld
 Jessica Day George, author